Henry Samuel Bedson, MD, MRCP (29 September 1929 – 6 September 1978), was a British virologist and head of the Department of Medical Microbiology at Birmingham Medical School, where his research focused on smallpox and monkeypox. He was head of the smallpox laboratory at Birmingham when Janet Parker, a photographer working above the laboratory, contracted smallpox and died.

He died on 6 September 1978, five days after being discovered with self-inflicted wounds to his throat.

Early life and education
Henry Bedson was born on 29 September 1929 to Sir Samuel Bedson and Dorothea Annie Hoffert, the second of three sons. He was educated at Brighton, Hove and Sussex Grammar School, before gaining admission to the London Hospital Medical College, where his father was Professor of Bacteriology. He graduated in 1952 after having received the Charrington prize for anatomical dissection, a distinction in the second bachelor of medicine examination, and the prize for clinical surgery.

Career
After completing his junior medical and surgical posts, Bedson took up an appointment in morbid anatomy and in clinical pathology in 1953.  A year later, he received a more senior appointment as junior registrar in pathology. In 1955 he joined the RAMC and served in Hong Kong until July 1957.

His career in virology began in 1958 when he was appointed John W. Garrett research fellow at the University of Liverpool's department of bacteriology, where he would spend the next six years. At Liverpool, he worked under the supervision of Allan Downie, a leading expert in poxviruses. He was appointed assistant lecturer in the following year and full lecturer a year later. In 1961 he invented the "Bedson ceiling test".

In 1964 Bedson was appointed Senior Lecturer and honorary NHS consultant in bacteriology and virology in the Department of Virology at the University of Birmingham. In 1969, he was promoted to Reader in Virology and in 1976 to Professor and head of Birmingham's new Department of Medical Microbiology.

His interest and research from his time at Liverpool focused on whitepox viruses, smallpox and monkeypox. In 1976 he was a member of the International Commission for the assessment of smallpox eradication in Pakistan and Afghanistan and of the World Health Organization informal group on monkeypox and related poxviruses viruses, in addition to the dangerous pathogens advisory group established by the Department of Health and Social Security.

Smallpox outbreak in Birmingham (1978)

In 1978, Bedson was head of the smallpox laboratory at Birmingham Medical School.

In late August 1978, during the bank holiday weekend, Bedson was on-call when he was called by Alasdair Geddes, the region's smallpox expert, to examine fluid samples taken from blisters of Janet Parker, a photographer working above Bedson's smallpox laboratory. She had been admitted to an infectious diseases ward at the East Birmingham Hospital with an initial diagnosis of flu and drug eruption. Bedson recognised the brick-shape smallpox virus on electron microscopy.

He attended the meeting at Birmingham area Health Authority's headquarters on 26 August, along with Geddes, S. S. Bakhkshi, the medical officer of environmental health, William Nicol, the Chair, and N. S. Galbraith, representing the public health laboratory service. The day after confirming the specific strain of smallpox, while in quarantine at his home in Cockthorpe Close, Harborne, he committed suicide by cutting his throat and died five days later on Wednesday 6 September. His suicide note read:

In Bedson's Munk's Roll biography published by the Royal College of Physicians, virologist Peter Wildy and Sir Gordon Wolstenholme wrote:

The verdict in court was that Bedson was "not guilty". How Parker exactly became infected with smallpox remains unknown.

Personal and family
In 1961, Bedson married Ann Patricia ( Ducker; died 31 January 2019, aged 81), a Yorkshire staff nurse working in Liverpool. They had a son and two daughters: Peter, Ruth and Sarah Elizabeth. He was a close friend of virologist Keith Dumbell, and a godparent to his children.

Bedson's hobbies included cricket, and dry fly fishing, an activity learnt from his childhood days with his father. He owned a holiday home in Llangynog, Wales.

Selected publications

References

Further reading

1929 births
1978 deaths
British virologists
British microbiologists
People educated at Brighton, Hove and Sussex Grammar School
Alumni of the London Hospital Medical College
Academics of the University of Liverpool
Academics of the University of Birmingham
1978 suicides
Suicides by sharp instrument in England